The Royal Navy has four vessels with the name HMS Erne; the name comes from the white-tailed eagle, also known as the erne.

The 20-gun sixth-rate post ship , launched in 1813 and wrecked in 1819 on the Isle of Sal, Cape Verde.
The Albacore-class gunboat  launched in 1856 and broken up in 1874.
The torpedo boat destroyer  launched in 1903 and wrecked in 1915 at Rattray Head.
The sloop  launched in 1939, renamed Wessex in 1952, and broken up in 1965.

Notes

References

Gossett, William Patrick (1986) The lost ships of the Royal Navy, 1793-1900. (London:Mansell). 

Royal Navy ship names